InTown Suites is a chain of extended stay properties in the United States, headquartered in Atlanta, GA. InTown Suites has 196 locations in 22 states.

Rates and services 

Currently, InTown Suites offers affordable weekly and monthly rates, depending on market and seasonality. The product offering falls between a traditional hotel and an apartment, with an average length of stay approaching 16 weeks.

The company owns and operates all of its locations, rather than franchising them.

History

Intown Suites was founded in 1988 by David Vickers. During two decades of existence, Intown Suites has proved to be a very successful business, and is currently one of the fastest growing extended-stay chains. In June 2013, the company was purchased by Starwood Capital Group.

In 1998, Intown Suites expanded from 26 to 76 properties in a $150 million investment, an alternative to going public. In 2001, Intown Suites had a room occupancy rate of 87%, compared with a 73% average for the entire industry. In 2002, Intown Suites expanded by purchasing Suburban Lodges of America for $99 million, four years later they acquired SuiteOne hotels. In 2007, InTown Suites purchased another 12 Suburban Lodge locations in Georgia, Florida and Alabama, plus two additional Suburban Lodge locations in Houston, Texas a year later.  In 2014, the company purchased four Savannah Suites location in Hampton Roads, Virginia.  In May 2015, the company added another 50 locations.  From 2017 to 2019, the company added 8 locations under the Uptown Suites brand.

References

External links

Hotels established in 1988
Extended stay hotel chains
Companies based in Atlanta